Herdman Brook converges with West Kill by Spruceton, New York.

References 

Rivers of New York (state)
Rivers of Greene County, New York